The 2015–16 VTB United League was the seventh complete season of the VTB United League. It was also the third season that the league functioned as the Russian domestic first tier level. CSKA Moscow was the defending champion, and the team successfully defended its title.

Teams

Krasnye Krylia withdrew from the league as the Samara Sports Palace was not adequate for the VTB United League (such as a minimum requirement of 3,000 seats). It planned to reapply for the 2016–17 season after renovations.

In its place, Georgian Superliga side VITA Tbilisi was chosen in July 2015, the first side from that country to play in the league. All other clubs from the previous season were confirmed on the same occasion, along with a rough draft of a calendar.

Stadia and locations

Notes
 Team makes its debut in the VTB United League.
 The defending champions, winners of the 2014–15 VTB United League.

Regular season

Standings

Results

Playoffs

Awards

Most Valuable Player

Playoffs MVP

Sixth Man of the Year

Young Player of the Year

Coach of the Year

Defensive Player of the Year

Monthly MVP

Statistical leaders
Final statistics.

|  style="width:50%; vertical-align:top;"|

Points

|}
|}

|  style="width:50%; vertical-align:top;"|

Assists

|}
|}

Season highs

References

External links
Official website

 
2015-16
2015–16 in European basketball leagues
2015–16 in Russian basketball
2015–16 in Finnish basketball
2015–16 in Latvian basketball
2015–16 in Estonian basketball
2015–16 in Belarusian basketball
2015–16 in Kazakhstani basketball
2015–16 in Czech basketball
2015–16 in Georgian basketball